Lewis Perdue (born May 1, 1949) is the author of 20 published books including Daughter of God, and The Da Vinci Legacy. Perdue was sued by Random House in 2003 when he charged that Dan Brown's The Da Vinci Code plagiarized those two books. Random House won the lawsuit but lost their demand to have Perdue pay their legal fees.

Life 
Perdue was born in the Mississippi Delta in 1949, to. He was expelled from the University of Mississippi in 1967 for leading a civil rights march. He graduated from Corning Community College in 1970 with an associate degree, before studying physics and biology at Cornell University, graduating with a bachelor's degree and honors in 1972. While at Cornell, he worked as a full-time reporter for The Ithaca Journal.

Perdue currently lives in Sonoma, California, with his wife, Megan, and two children.

Works 
 The Delphi Betrayal (1981)
 Queen's Gate Reckoning (1982)
 The Da Vinci Legacy (1983)
 The Tesla Bequest (1984)
 The Linz Testament (1985)
 Zaibatsu (1988)
 Daughter of God (1999)
 Slatewiper (2003)
 Perfect Killer (2005)
 Die By Wire (2011)

References

Living people
1949 births
20th-century American novelists
21st-century American novelists
American male novelists
20th-century American male writers
21st-century American male writers